Statistics of Liberian Premier League for the 2003 season.

Overview
It was contested by 8 teams, and it was not finished.

League standings

References
Liberia - List of final tables (RSSSF)

Football competitions in Liberia
Lea